Isabelle Amyes (born 13 June 1950) is an English actress best known for her role as Barbara Hunt in the British TV drama Bad Girls from 2000 to 2003. Another prominent role was as Fanny in Love in a Cold Climate (1980). Her various guest appearances on other television programmes include The New Statesman, House of Cards, The Darling Buds of May, A Touch of Frost and As Time Goes By.

Personal life
Her father was Julian Amyes; a British film and television director and producer.

Filmography

External links 

 

1950 births
Living people
English television actresses
People from Grappenhall and Thelwall
21st-century English actresses